Heat Wave  is a film in the action / adventure genre directed by Rex Piano. It is about a heat wave that threatens to turn Los Angeles County into a parched, lifeless desert.

Plot
There is an unexplained sudden rise in temperatures. A scientist has to put her theories into practice and come up with a solution to prevent what could be the inevitable. She is in a race against time to find the source of a heat wave. Otherwise, Los Angeles County could turn into lifeless desert. A greedy giant corporation that is also out to make millions of dollars is a feature in the film. The lead role of Dr. Kate Jansen is played by Jamie Luner. Other cast include Barbara Niven, Cole S McKay, David Storrs, Greg Evigan, Lynn Milano, Richard Tanner, Robert R. Shafer, Ted Monte and Tom Poster.

Background
It was released on January 9, 2009. The story was written by Jody Wheeler and Paolo Mazzucato. It was directed by Rex Piano, who had also directed Blind Injustice in 2005. It was produced by Charles Arthur Berg and distributed by Regent Releasing /here! Films. It is also known as City on Fire.

Cast
 Jamie Luner as Dr. Kate Jansen   
 Greg Evigan as Ed Dobbs
 Ted Monte as Oliver Wilton 
 Barbara Niven	as Governor Carol Quinlan 
 Robert R. Shafer as Roy Rogan 
 Jake Thornton	as Dr. Charles Covington 
 Natalie Salins as Dana Wu
 Richard Tanner as Morty
 Lynn Milano as Ms. Grier 
 David Storrs as Tony
 Tom Poster as Clive Williams
 Cole S. McKay	as Brucker

References

External links
 

2009 films
2000s English-language films